Jakob Ellemann-Jensen (born 25 September 1973) is a Danish politician who has served as Deputy Prime Minister of Denmark and Minister of Defence since 2022. He has been the leader of Venstre since 2019. 

A member of the Folketing since the 2011 general election, he served as Minister for Environment and Food under Prime Minister Lars Løkke Rasmussen from 2 May 2018 to 27 June 2019. He was spokesman on political affairs for Venstre from 2015 to 2018 and again briefly in 2019.

Early life
Ellemann-Jensen was born on 25 September 1973 in Hørsholm, approximately 25km (15.5 mi) north of Copenhagen. He is the son of former Foreign Minister Uffe Ellemann-Jensen and former editor-in-chief Alice Vestergaard. 

Ellemann-Jensen graduated from N. Zahle's School in 1992. He went on to complete his BSc at the Copenhagen Business School in 1999, as well as his MSc in 2002, also at Copenhagen Business School. From 2000 to 2002, he worked as a legal advisor for PricewaterhouseCoopers and from 2002 to 2005 as a lawyer at IBM Denmark, where he later became head of the contract and negotiation department. From 2007 to 2011, he worked as a corporate lawyer for GN Store Nord.

Political career
Ellemann-Jensen was first elected into parliament in the 2011 election, receiving 7,786 votes; he was reelected in the 2015 election with 8,678 votes. 

In 2018, Ellemann-Jensen became the minister for Environment and Food in the third Løkke Rasmussen cabinet.

Ellemann-Jensen was elected again in the 2019 Danish general election, receiving 19,388 votes. After Lars Løkke Rasmussen stepped down as Venstre's party leader after the election, the party elected Ellemann-Jensen as the new leader.

Other activities
 Trilateral Commission, Member of the European Group

Notes

References

External links
 

|-

|-

1973 births
Living people
Copenhagen Business School alumni
Agriculture ministers of Denmark
Danish Ministers for the Environment
Venstre (Denmark) politicians
IBM employees
PricewaterhouseCoopers people
21st-century Danish lawyers
People from Hørsholm Municipality
Members of the Folketing 2011–2015
Members of the Folketing 2015–2019
Members of the Folketing 2019–2022
Leaders of Venstre (Denmark)
Members of the Folketing 2022–2026